Someone to Love may refer to:

Songs 
 "Someone to Love" (Fountains of Wayne song)
 "Someone to Love" (Jon B. song)
 "Someone to Love" (Sean Maguire song), 1994
 "Someone to Love", by The Grass Roots from Move Along
 "Someone to Love", by Minipop from A New Hope
 "Someone to Love", by Moby from Animal Rights

Other uses 
 Someone to Love (1987 film), a 1987 film directed by Henry Jaglom
 Someone to Love (1928 film), a 1928 American comedy silent film
 Your Song: Someone to Love, a story arc during Season 10 of the Filipino TV series Your Song

See also 
 Love Someone (disambiguation)
 "Someone to Love Me (Naked)", a 2011 song by Mary J. Blige
 "Someone to Love Me", a song by Diddy – Dirty Money from Last Train to Paris
 Someone to Love You, a 2002 album by Ruff Endz
 Somebody to Love (disambiguation)
 Somebody to Love Me (disambiguation)